Vahaafenua Vitolio Tipotio (born 17 July 1975) is a French track and field athlete who competes in the javelin throw. Born in Wallis and Futuna, he competed for his native nation at the South Pacific Games, winning a bronze in 1995 and a silver in 1999.

Tipotio's highest honour was a gold medal at the 2005 Mediterranean Games. He is a two-time silver medallist at the Francophonie Games, reaching the podium in 1997 and again in 2005.

He is a member of Ca Montreuil 93 athletic club.

International competitions

National titles
French Athletics Championships
Javelin throw: 2006, 2007, 2009, 2013

See also
List of javelin throw national champions (men)

References

External links



Living people
1975 births
Wallis and Futuna javelin throwers
French male javelin throwers
Mediterranean Games gold medalists for France
Mediterranean Games medalists in athletics
Athletes (track and field) at the 2005 Mediterranean Games
Wallis and Futuna sportsmen